Rent One Park is a stadium in Marion, Illinois that was completed in 2007.  It is primarily used for baseball and was previously the home of the Southern Illinois Miners of the Frontier League from 2007–2021.

The stadium has a contemporary, non-traditional look, devoid of the common red brick and green-painted steel common among ballparks around the United States.

One of the most unusual features of the new stadium is the roof, which slopes down toward the field. As a result, foul balls hit by players can sometimes roll back down for spectators to catch.

The stadium is located roughly 120 miles southeast of St Louis on Interstate 57. There are over 3,400 standard armchair ballpark seats including wider chair seating behind home plate. Down the left field line and in the outfield is lawn seating that can accommodate over 2,000 fans. Rent One Park also has two picnic gardens: Bullpen Bar-n-Grille down the right field line that can host as many as 250 people and the Rent One Picnic Garden located in the outfield with seating for over 500 people. The upper level features 14 luxury suites and an enclosed banquet area for approximately 200 persons.

Rent One Park also contains an open-air entry plaza, home and visitor clubhouses, dedicated maintenance building, administrative offices, and team store. The scoreboard and video board are accompanied by 12 panels for advertisement on the right-field wall, beyond and above the bullpens. Down the left field side in the corner of the park is the Fun Zone, a children's play area with various games.

The company that holds the naming rights, Rent One, is a rent-to-own retail store chain.

Following the folding of the Southern Illinois Miners baseball team in 2021, the venue was then purchased by Illinois Center Project, LLC. with the goal of converting the stadium into a multi-use venue.

Since 2022, the stadium has been used for concerts, equestrian events, community gatherings, and more, along with local little league and high school baseball tournaments.

The Colt World Series is currently hosted at Rent One Park each summer after relocating from Lafayette, Indiana.

The first game 
The first game in the park was played May 29, 2007. Over 6,200 fans saw the Southern Illinois Miners defeat the Evansville Otters 9-6.

Records   
On August 10, 2007, the Southern Illinois Miners broke the Frontier League regular season single game attendance record with 6,718 fans. In that game at Rent One Park, the Miners defeat the River City Rascals 8-0.

In their first season the Miners also broke the single season attendance record by hosting 259,392 fans, averaging over 5,000 fans per game.

Other events 
Because Rent One Park has Sportexe Turf instead of regular grass and dirt, events other than baseball can be held there throughout the year, including live concerts. 

On June 6, 2018, the Ohio Valley Conference announced that Rent One Park would host the conference's postseason baseball tournament in 2019 and 2020, the first time that a postseason NCAA baseball tournament will be held in the Southern Illinois region since 1986.

External links 
Rent One Homepage
 http://southernilminers.blogspot.com/ Miners Blog

Notes 

Minor league baseball venues
Marion, Illinois
Baseball venues in Illinois
Buildings and structures in Williamson County, Illinois
Tourist attractions in Williamson County, Illinois
Sports venues completed in 2007